The 2005 Rice Owls football team represented Rice University in the 2005 NCAA Division I-A college football season. The Owls were led by head coach Ken Hatfield, who resigned at the end of the season. They played their home games at Rice Stadium in Houston, Texas.

Schedule

References

Rice
Rice Owls football seasons
Rice Owls football